Flyktningerennet is a cross country ski race, running from Lierne, Norway to Gäddede, Sweden. The ski race follows this route in remembrance of the people who fled Nazi German-occupied Norway for Sweden during the Second World War.

The first race was arranged in 1950, with H. Hemmingsson as winner. The first female Flyktningerenn was arranged in 1964.

Winner Men 1950–2014

Winner Woman 1964–2014

References

External links
Flyktningerennet official home page

Cross-country skiing competitions
Cross-country skiing in Norway
Cross-country skiing competitions in Sweden
Lierne
1950 establishments in Sweden
1950 establishments in Norway
Recurring sporting events established in 1950
April sporting events
Sport in Jämtland County